Van Manen is a Dutch toponymic surname meaning "from ", a former town in Gelderland now part of Ede. Variants include Van Maanen and Van Maenen. People with this name include:

Aletta van Manen (born 1958), Dutch field hockey player
Bert van Manen (born 1965), Australian politician
Bertien van Manen (born 1942), Dutch photographer
Hans van Manen (born 1932), Dutch choreographer and ballet dancer
 (1752–1822), Dutch writer, patriot, and judge
Johan van Manen (1877–1943), Dutch orientalist
Max van Manen (born 1942), Dutch-born Canadian academic
 (born 1940), Dutch jazz composer and trombonist
Willem Christiaan van Manen, (1842-1905) Dutch theologian

References

Dutch-language surnames
Toponymic surnames
Surnames of Dutch origin